The  Sargent House, at 103 Catahoula Street in Harrisonburg in Catahoula Parish, Louisiana, was built in about 1880 with some elements of Greek Revival style.  It was listed on the National Register of Historic Places in 1980.

It is a one and a half story frame raised cottage which is nine bays wide and two rooms deep.  The property backs onto the Ouachita River.

It was deemed "locally significant in the area of architecture as an unusually large example of a traditional raised cottage. According to the Louisiana state-wide survey it is Harrisonburg's only example as well as the town's oldest structure."

See also
National Register of Historic Places listings in Catahoula Parish, Louisiana

References

Houses on the National Register of Historic Places in Louisiana
Greek Revival architecture in Louisiana
Houses completed in 1880
Catahoula Parish, Louisiana